Field marshal may refer to:

Rank
Field marshal, the top Army officer rank used by various countries
Field marshal (Australia)
Field marshal (Egypt) - refer Mushir 
Field marshal (Finland)
Field marshal (France)
Field marshal (India)
Field marshal (Iran)
Field marshal (Japan) - refer Gensui (Imperial Japanese Army)
Field marshal (Libya)
Field marshal (Malaysia) - refer Yang di-Pertuan Agong
Field marshal (Philippines)
Field marshal (Pakistan)
Field marshal (Serbia and Yugoslavia)
Field marshal (South Africa)
Field marshal (Sri Lanka)
Field marshal (Thailand) - refer Chom Phon
Field marshal (New Zealand)
Field marshal (Uganda)
Field marshal (United Kingdom)
Generalfeldmaschall (Germany)
General-feldmarshal (Russian Empire)

People

See List of field marshals

Other
The Field Marshal (film) 1927
"The Field-Marshal", Russian song by Mussorgsky
Field Marshal Montgomery Pipe Band
Fieldmarshal (Role Variant), one of the 16 role variants of the Keirsey Temperament Sorter
Field Marshall, a model of agricultural tractor made in England from 1945 to 1957
Field Marshall, an introductory war game published by Jedko Games in 1975
Field Marshals' Hall of the Winter Palace in Saint Petersburg, Russia
Field Marshal: The 13th and second highest PvP honor rank of the Alliance in World of Warcraft

See also
 Five-star rank
 Generalissimo
 List of field marshals
 List of Austrian field marshals
 List of Austro-Hungarian field marshals
 List of British field marshals
 List of German field marshals
 List of Iranian field marshals
 List of Russian field marshals
 List of Swedish field marshals
 List of Thai field marshals
 Lists of Turkish field marshals
 Marshal of the Soviet Union
   Mariscal de Campo, literally Field Marshal, is the Spanish word for "quarterback" in American football: (see :es:Mariscal de campo (fútbol americano))